Sergey Lavrenov (born August 16, 1972) is a retired male weightlifter from Belarus, who competed in the men's lightweight class weight (– 69 kg) at the 2000 Summer Olympics and won a bronze medal. He also competed at the 2004 Summer Olympics in Athens, Greece.

References
Sergey Lavrenov at Sports-reference.com
Sergey Lavrenov at Noc-vitebsk.by  

1972 births
Sportspeople from Vitebsk
Living people
Belarusian male weightlifters
Olympic weightlifters of Belarus
Weightlifters at the 2000 Summer Olympics
Weightlifters at the 2004 Summer Olympics
Olympic bronze medalists for Belarus
Olympic medalists in weightlifting
Medalists at the 2000 Summer Olympics
European Weightlifting Championships medalists